It was a Dacian fortified town.

References

Petroșani
Dacian fortresses in Hunedoara County